Methylobacterium aerolatum  is a and motile bacteria from the genus of Methylobacterium which has been isolated from an air sample in Suwon in Korea.

References

Further reading

External links
Type strain of Methylobacterium aerolatum at BacDive -  the Bacterial Diversity Metadatabase

Hyphomicrobiales
Bacteria described in 2008